Yakov Rekhter is a well-known network protocol designer and software programmer. He was heavily involved in internet protocol  development, and its predecessors, from their early stages.

Dr. Rekhter was one of the leading architects and a major software developer of the NSFNET Backbone Phase II. He co-designed the Border Gateway Protocol (BGP), the core routing protocol of the Internet. He was also one of the lead designers of Tag Switching (of which MPLS is one form), BGP/MPLS based VPNs, and MPLS Traffic Engineering. Among his most recent activities is the work on MPLS Multicast, Multicast in VPLS, and Multicast in BGP/MPLS VPNs (aka 2547 VPNs). His other contributions to contemporary Internet technology include: GMPLS, Classless Inter-Domain Routing (CIDR) and IP address allocation for private Internets.

He is the author or co-author of more than 80 IETF RFCs, and numerous papers and articles on TCP/IP and the Internet. His recent books include: MPLS: Technology and Applications (Morgan Kaufmann, 2000) and Switching in IP Networks: IP Switching, Tag Switching and Related Technologies (Morgan Kaufmann, 1998).

Rekhter joined Juniper Networks in December 2000, where he was a Juniper Fellow. Prior to joining Juniper, Yakov worked at Cisco Systems, where he was a Cisco Fellow. Prior to joining Cisco in 1995, he worked at IBM T.J. Watson Research Center.

He retired from Juniper Networks and the industry in January 2015.

Napkin Story
In January 1989 at the 12th IETF meeting in Austin, Texas, Yakov Rekhter and Kirk Lougheed sat down at a table to design what ultimately became the Border Gateway Protocol (BGP). The initial BGP design was recorded on a napkin rumored to have been heavily spattered with ketchup. The design on the napkin was expanded to three hand-written sheets of paper from which the first interoperable BGP implementation was quickly developed. A photocopy of these 3 sheets of paper now hangs on the wall of a routing protocol development area at Cisco Systems in Milpitas, California.

References

People in information technology
Living people
Year of birth missing (living people)
Internet pioneers